Robert Charles Patterson (1844 – 21 November 1907) was an Australian politician. He was born in Melbourne. In 1900 he was elected to the Tasmanian House of Assembly as the Free Trade member for Hobart. He transferred to South Hobart in 1903 and left politics in 1904. He briefly led the Opposition from May 1903 to March 1904. Patterson died in Hobart in 1907.

References

1844 births
1907 deaths
Free Trade Party politicians
Members of the Tasmanian House of Assembly
Politicians from Melbourne
Politicians from Hobart
19th-century Australian politicians